Mikiko Terui (Kanji:, born 19 October 1952) is a Japanese cross-country skier. She competed in two events at the 1976 Winter Olympics.

References

External links
 

1952 births
Living people
Japanese female cross-country skiers
Olympic cross-country skiers of Japan
Cross-country skiers at the 1976 Winter Olympics
Sportspeople from Akita Prefecture
20th-century Japanese women